Adana Gundogdu Schools is a large private educational establishment situated in Adana Turkey. It educates nearly 3,000 students aged between the ages of 3 and 18. It was founded in 1988 by Yunus Gundogdu a very prominent local businessman who wanted to create a school for his three children.

It is a privately owned establishment which has been approved and is subject to MEB regulations. Gundogdu is a day school and attracts students from all local areas including Seyhan, Cukurova and Ceyhan.

History 
Gundogdu first opened its doors to 86 students in 1988, its original campus was situated next to the Seyhan Lake it moved to its current campus in 1993. The current campus is 12000 square meters and houses all schools. This includes the International Children's University, Primary School, Middle School, Science High School and Anatolian High School. The International Children's university was added in 2012, Ibrahim Kutluay Basketball school, Gymboree and British Swim School have been added to the campus in 2013.

Education 

Gundogdu has five different schools all based on the same campus. The first school is International Children's University which houses students from the ages of 3 to 6 years old.  This school has its own separate building and is unique by having no stairs. The classes have 24 students and they follow the HighScope teaching method. Teaching standards are assessed by Early Years Ireland Currently there are 3 Nino Classes (3-4 year olds) 4 Pre-kinder classes (4–5 years old) and 6 Kinder classes (5–6 years old).

The Primary School is for students from years 1 to 4 and follows the Turkish National Curriculum prepared by MEB The students are taught from 8:30 until 16:30 Monday to Friday and the school follows all national holidays. Currently there are 6 classes in each year group, each class has 24 students. The main subjects are taught by class teachers, arts, sports, foreign languages, music and robotic lessons are taught by specialist teachers.

Middle School is the largest building with over 1500 students. There are 4 years of Middle School resulting in the students taking the national TEOG Exam in November and April of their final year. The school again follows the National Curriculum but all subjects are taught by specialist teachers. Each class has a maximum size of 24.  In the 5th grade the students follow an intensive English program, this includes lessons in Science and Maths in English using the Cambridge International Exam system.

High School is split into two different schools, depending on the students TEOG results they can attend Science High School or Anatolian High School.  Each school is based in the same building and follows the Turkish National Curriculum. Science High School is usually attended by students who wish to go into the medical profession, engineers or any careers that require a higher level of knowledge in Maths and Science. Anatolian School concentrates more on language study and social Sciences. There are currently 10 Science High School classes and 23 Anatolian classes.  Each school has 4 years of study and in the final year all students take the LYS Exam, this determines which university and which course they will study.

Accreditation 
Eaquals association accredited the foreign languages department of the school in March 2015. In November 2016, the Council of International Schools (CIS) accepted Adana Gundogdu Schools as a member and currently working towards accreditation. The schools have recently also applied to participate in the Turkish Perfection Awards which assess the company using the EFQM model.

Student Council and Alumni 

Gundogdu has a large student council that is voted on every year. The student council consists of a president and over 400 council members, these members have responsibility for many social projects this has including, concerts to help Children with leukaemia, supply school furniture to state schools who need it and raising money for local charities.
Alumni includes Gozde Durmuş and Canan Dağdeviren who were recently identified by MIT Technology Review as being people to watch under the age of 35. Two students have gone on to represent Turkey in the London Olympics in Basketball and Volleyball. Gundogdu has educated many local businessmen including the current president Gokhan Gundogdu, Polen Uslu-Pehlivan who is a player in the Turkish national volleyball team, Şaziye İvegen and Naile İvegen sisters who have played in Turkish National Basketball Team, Direnç Bada who became the first Turkish player to go to the  Australia Open.

Intellectual Citizen Program 
This program was developed to encourage students to read, this program was developed in-house and has three steps. First the students read the set book, then they write a report on the book at the same time a group students prepare a for and against debate, the program is used across all schools from Primary First grade until 11th grade in High School and also across all languages taught.

Academic Success 
Gundogdu has had a successful record in the national TEOG exams.

References

Private schools in Turkey